Leslie O'Brien (8 April 1905 – 26 December 1967) was an Australian cricketer. He played eight first-class matches for New South Wales between 1937/38 and 1938/39.

See also
 List of New South Wales representative cricketers

References

External links
 

1905 births
1967 deaths
Australian cricketers
New South Wales cricketers
Cricketers from Sydney